The countries of Europe can be ordered by their geographical area. As a continent, Europe's total geographical area is about 10.18 million square kilometres. Transcontinental countries are ranked according to the size of their European part only. The 14 countries marked with an asterisk (*) are transcontinental. Only sovereign states are considered.

Inland water is included in area numbers.

Table

Definition
Europe and Asia are contiguous with each other; thus, the exact boundary between them is not clearly defined, and often follows historical, political, and cultural definitions, rather than geographical.

Map of Europe, showing one of the most commonly used continental boundaries

Legend:
Blue = Contiguous transcontinental countries
Green = Sometimes considered European but geographically outside Europe's boundaries

Range
The area of European countries varies widely, over several orders of magnitude:

See also
Area and population of European countries
List of African countries by area
List of Asian countries by area
List of European countries by population
List of North American countries by area
List of Oceanian countries by area
List of South American countries by area

Notes

References

Area
European countries
Area